Ahmed Ildiz (born 29 November 1996) is a professional footballer who plays as a midfielder for Turkish club Pendikspor on loan from Alanyaspor. Born In Austria, he is a youth international for Turkey.

Club career
Ildiz is a youth product of Rapid Wien, joining them since the age of 14. On 1 September 2016. he transferred to Kasımpaşa, and Ildiz made his professional debut for them in a 2–1 loss to Konyaspor on 6 November 2016.

International career
Ildiz was born in Austria and is of Turkish descent. He is a youth international for the Turkey national under-21 football team.

Personal life
Ahmed's brother, Muhammed Ildiz, is also a professional footballer currently playing for Gaziantepspor in the Süper Lig.

References

External links

1996 births
Living people
Footballers from Vienna
Turkish footballers
Turkey under-21 international footballers
Association football midfielders
Austrian footballers
Austrian people of Turkish descent
Yeni Malatyaspor footballers
Kasımpaşa S.K. footballers
Alanyaspor footballers
Eyüpspor footballers
Pendikspor footballers
Austrian Regionalliga players
Süper Lig players
TFF First League players